Challenge of the Gladiator is a 1965 Italian peplum film directed by Domenico Paolella.

Plot 

Treacherous Roman senator Lucius Quintilius plans a secret journey into Thrace to recover a legendary treasure. He is accompanied by his daughter Livia posing as a Christian slave girl, his cruel henchman Commodio, and Terenzius, an ex-gladiator and Nero look-alike who fools the local Thracians into believing he is the real Emperor. But Lucius's plans are thwarted by Spartacus and his band of rebels who succeed in capturing the treasure for Thrace. When news arrives from Rome that the real Nero has died, local Roman governor Consul Metellus joins forces with Spartacus to defeat the traitors.

Cast 

 Peter Lupus: Spartacus (credited as Rock Stevens) 
 Massimo Serato: Senator Lucio Quintilio 
 Gloria Milland: Livia 
 Livio Lorenzon: Commodio 
 Piero Lulli: Consul Metello 
 Walter Barnes: Terenzo 
 Andrea Checchi 
 Dario Michaelis 
 Franco Ressel 
 Bruno Scipioni 
 Salvatore Borghese: Gladiator

References

External links

Challenge of the Gladiator at Variety Distribution

1965 films
Films directed by Domenico Paolella
Peplum films
1960s fantasy adventure films
Films set in the Roman Empire
Films set in the 1st century
Cultural depictions of Spartacus
Sword and sandal films
Italian fantasy adventure films
1960s Italian films
1960s Italian-language films